The Toast of New Orleans is a 1950 MGM musical film directed by Norman Taurog and choreographed by Eugene Loring. It stars Mario Lanza, Kathryn Grayson, David Niven, J. Carrol Naish, James Mitchell and Rita Moreno. The film was made after That Midnight Kiss, Lanza's successful film debut, as an opportunity for Lanza to sing on the big screen again.

Plot
Set in Louisiana in 1905, the plot revolves around Pepe Abellard Duvalle, a bayou fisherman with a natural singing talent, who falls in love with opera star soprano Suzette Micheline (Grayson). Micheline's manager (Niven) hears Duvalle sing and invites him to come to New Orleans to sing. Reluctantly, Duvalle allows himself to be groomed for the opera. At first resistant to his advances, Micheline also falls in love with Duvalle, but is disenchanted by his transformation into a cultured gentleman. Ultimately, Duvalle regains his former rough charm and the couple unite.

Cast
 Kathryn Grayson as Suzette Micheline
 Mario Lanza as Pepe Abellard Duvalle
 David Niven as Jacques Riboudeaux
 J. Carrol Naish as Nicky Duvalle
 James Mitchell as Pierre
 Richard Hageman as Maestro P. Trellini
 Clinton Sundberg as Oscar
 Sig Arno as Mayor
 Rita Moreno as Tina

Music
In addition to selected arias from the operas Carmen, Madama Butterfly, and La traviata, the film includes the song "Be My Love", which was nominated for an Academy Award.

Production
The success of the first screen pairing of Grayson and Lanza, That Midnight Kiss (1949), led quickly to the production of The Toast of New Orleans. Shooting began in late December 1949 and concluded in early March 1950. Thirty-five sets were required; three adjoining sound stages on the MGM lot were combined to house one of the largest indoor sets constructed for a film musical.

The climactic scenes feature Lanza and Grayson's characters performing in a production of Madama Butterfly. Previously, Lanza had made his debut on the operatic stage as Pinkerton in 1948.

Lanza earned $50,000 for his appearance in the film, twice what his contract provided. The Toast of New Orleans also marked Hageman's acting debut, and was Moreno's first role in a movie musical.

Reception
Distributed by Loew's, The Toast of New Orleans premiered at the Loew's State in New Orleans on September 19, 1950; it was released nationally on September 29.

According to MGM records the film earned $1,671,000 in the US and Canada and $1,580,000 elsewhere, leading to a profit of $22,000.

The film is recognized by American Film Institute in these lists:
 2004: AFI's 100 Years...100 Songs:	
 "Be My Love" – Nominated

References

External links

 
 
 
 

1950 films
1950s English-language films
1950 musical films
Films directed by Norman Taurog
Films set in New Orleans
Films set in 1905
Metro-Goldwyn-Mayer films
Films about opera
Films produced by Joe Pasternak
Films with screenplays by George Wells
American musical films
1950s American films